Claus Friis Christiansen (born 27 March 1972) is a Danish former professional footballer player and now manager.

Career
In 2017 Christiansen became manager of Silkeborg KFUM. He previously managed Aarhus Fremad.

References

1972 births
Living people
Association football midfielders
Danish men's footballers
Danish football managers
Aabyhøj IF players
Aarhus Gymnastikforening players
Danish Superliga players
Aarhus Fremad managers